Sharad Ponkshe is an Indian actor and writer, mainly working in Hindi and Marathi cinema. He is a speaker and an actor in Marathi film, theater and television.

Career
Ponkshe started his career in the year 1988 and worked in multiple fields including Marathi stage, Marathi television and film industry.  After his education in the college he immediately started his career in the Marathi film and television industry. He became very popular with the daily serial Damini on DD Sahyadri. He played a role with Pratiksha Lonkar in that serial. Both played many roles in plays and movies. The TV serial Agnihotra and Vadalvaat gave Ponkshe enormous popularity in Maharashtra. Later he played the role of Ranade's father in the TV serial Unch Majha Zoka, which was based on the life of Mahadev Govind Ranade and Ramabai Ranade.

Ponkshe played an important role in the play Me Nathuram Godse Boltoy, which was based on a very sensitive issue of assassination of Mahatma Gandhi. He started playing this in 1988 in which he used to play the main role of Nathuram Godse. He continues to get threats for playing Mahatma Gandhi's assassin Nathuram Godse. He did more than 1000 shows of this play. His play was stopped many times in the theatre. Overall he played more than 100 roles in television and films. He had a great respect to the actor and director Vinay Apte who gave him the role in the above play.

In 2021, he was seen in the Colors TV sitcom Bawara Dil. He played the role of Lalit Rao Lokhande in Sony SAB Sitcom Sajan Re Phir Jhooth Mat Bolo. He plays the role of Vinayak Kanitkar aka Dada, in the Marathi serial  Thipkyanchi Rangoli on Star Pravah .

Personal life
Ponkshe is known for his pro-Savarkar stance and has lectured about Savarkar all over the world. Ponkshe was diagnosed with cancer in December 2018. He underwent chemotherapy and returned to the stage with play Himalayachi Sawli in 2019.

Films

Plays
 Himalayachi Sawali
 Me Nathuram Godse Boltoy
 Tya Tighanchi Gosht
 Ek Diwas Matha Kade
 Gandh Nishigandhacha
 Saraswati Tuzich
 Natasamrat
 Barister
 Asa Zalach Kasa
 Tichi Kahani
 Kabirache Kay Karayache
 Ramle Mi
 Sukhani Nanda
 Zale Mokle Aabhal
 Gandhi Ambedkar
 Varun Sagle Sarkhe
 Athang
 Tu Fakt Ho Mhan
 Kala Ya Laglya Jeeva
 Var Bhetu Naka
 Umbartha
 Baykocha Hun Kasa Karava
 Lahan Pan Dega Deva
 Tichi Kahani
 Beiman
 Bharat Bhagya Vidhata
 Nandi
 Eka Kshanat

TV shows
 Vahinisaheb
 Ase He Kanyadan
 Aai Majhi Kalubai
 Thipkyanchi Rangoli
 Daar Ughad Baye
 Bawara Dil
 Unch Majha Zoka
 Sajan Re Phir Jhooth Mat Bolo
 Jai Malhar
 Durva
 Abhalmaya
 Vadalvaat
 Agnihotra
 Agnihotra 2
 Bandini
 Kunku
 Damini
 Mothi Tyachi Sawali
 Songati
 Ek Wada Zapatlela
 Jhoka
 Valan
 Dhakka
 Kalyani
 Aakash Peltana
 Indradhanushya
 Aadhunik Kunti
 Durga
 He Bandh Reshamache
 Mahashweta
 Ladha
 Chakravyuha
 Gharkul
 Aapli Manase
 Agnipariksha
 Ashakya
 Gajara
 Jhale Unhache Chandane
 Arth
 Akashjhep
 Manbhiman
 Ujwal Prabhat
 Tyachya Ya Gharat
 Vajwa Re Vajwa
 Aaradhana

References

External links

Indian male film actors
1968 births
Living people
Ponkshe, Sharad
Male actors from Maharashtra
Male actors in Hindi cinema